The HS postcode area, also known as the Outer Hebrides postcode area, is a group of nine postcode districts, within eight post towns, covering the Outer Hebrides in Scotland.

Coverage
The approximate coverage of the postcode districts:

|-
! HS1
| STORNOWAY
| Stornoway (immediate area), Plasterfield
| rowspan=9|Comhairle nan Eilean Siar
|-
! HS2
| ISLE OF LEWIS
| Settlements in Lewis outside the Stornoway area includingBack, Carloway, Ness, North Lochs, Park (South Lochs), Point, Uig and West Side

|-
! HS3
| ISLE OF HARRIS
| Harris excluding Leverburgh and Rodel area

|-
! HS4
| ISLE OF SCALPAY
| All settlements

|-
! HS5
| ISLE OF HARRIS
| Leverburgh, Rodel

|-
! HS6
| ISLE OF NORTH UIST
| All settlements

|-
! HS7
| ISLE OF BENBECULA
| All settlements

|-
! HS8
| ISLE OF SOUTH UIST
| All settlements

|-
! HS9
| ISLE OF BARRA
| All settlements, including Mingulay

|}

Map

See also
Postcode Address File
List of postcode areas in the United Kingdom

References

External links
Royal Mail's Postcode Address File
A quick introduction to Royal Mail's Postcode Address File (PAF)

Postcode areas covering Scotland
Outer Hebrides